Story TV is a Korean drama production company.

Works

References

External links
  

Television production companies of South Korea
Mass media companies established in 2010
Companies based in Gyeonggi Province
2010 establishments in South Korea